AS Commune II (Association Sportive Commune II) is a Malian football club based in Bamako. They play in the second division in Malian football in 2008, and were last in the top division in the 2007/07 season. Their home stadium is Stade Municipal de Commune II.

References

Translation from French language Wikipedia.

Football clubs in Mali
Sport in Bamako